Essinge may refer to:

Stora Essingen, Stockholm, Sweden
Lilla Essingen, Stockholm, Sweden